Kamel Lemoui (28 February 1939 – 3 January 2022) was an Algerian football player and manager.

Playing career
Born in Batna, Lemoui played club football for RC Paris B, Béziers, US Biskra, MC Alger, CR Belcourt, Olympique de Médéa and JS El Biar. He also earned seven caps for the Algeria national team between 1963 and 1968.

Coaching career
Lemoui managed the Algeria national team.

Death
He died from COVID-19 on 3 January 2022, at the age of 82, during the COVID-19 pandemic in France.

References

1939 births
2022 deaths
People from Batna, Algeria
20th-century Algerian people
Algerian footballers
Racing Club de France Football players
AS Béziers Hérault (football) players
US Biskra players
MC Alger players
CR Belouizdad players
Olympique de Médéa players
JS El Biar players
Ligue 2 players
Association football defenders
Algerian expatriate footballers
Algerian expatriate sportspeople in France
Expatriate footballers in France
Algeria international footballers
Competitors at the 1967 Mediterranean Games
1968 African Cup of Nations players
Mediterranean Games competitors for Algeria
Algerian football managers
Algeria national football team managers
Deaths from the COVID-19 pandemic in France